Patrick Bellew, 1st Baron Bellew  (29 January 1798 – 10 December 1866), known as Sir Patrick Bellew, 7th Baronet, from 1827 to 1848, was an Irish Whig politician.

Early life 
Born in London, he was born as the second son of Sir Edward Bellew, 6th Baronet (1735-1795), and his wife Mary Anne Strange (1760-1837), daughter of Richard Strange of Rockwell Castle. He succeeded his father as baronet in 1827.

Career 
In 1831, he was elected to the House of Commons for County Louth, a seat he held until 1832. He was reelected for the constituency in 1834, representing it for the next three years. Bellew served as high sheriff of County Louth in 1831 and was then appointed lord lieutenant of Louth until his death in 1866. He was also commissioner of national education in Ireland from 1839 to 1866 and a commissioner of charitable donations and bequests for Ireland from 1844 to 1857. He was admitted to the Irish Privy Council in 1838 and in 1848 he was raised to the Peerage of Ireland as Baron Bellew, of Barmeath, in the County of Louth.

Personal life 
Bellew married Spanish noblewoman Anna Fermina de Mendoza (1800–1857), only daughter of Admiral Don José Maria de Mendoza y Rios (1761-1816), in 1829. She died in 1857. Bellew survived her by nine years and died in December 1866, aged 68. He was succeeded in his titles by his son Edward.

Notes

References 
Kidd, Charles, Williamson, David (editors). Debrett's Peerage and Baronetage (1990 edition). New York: St Martin's Press, 1990.

External links 

1798 births
1866 deaths
Barons in the Peerage of Ireland
Peers of Ireland created by Queen Victoria
Lord-Lieutenants of Louth
Members of the Privy Council of Ireland
Members of the Parliament of the United Kingdom for County Louth constituencies (1801–1922)
Bellew, Patrick
Bellew, Patrick
Bellew, Patrick
UK MPs who were granted peerages
High Sheriffs of County Louth